The Austrian State Prize for European Literature, also known in Austria as the European Literary Award (Europäischer Literaturpreis), is an Austrian literary prize awarded by the Federal Chancellery for Arts, Culture, and Media to European writers. Established in 1965, the prize is endowed with a purse of 25,000 €. The prize was not awarded in 1969.

List of winners

References

External links
 

Austrian literary awards
Awards established in 1965
Literary awards honoring lifetime achievement
European literary awards